Christopher Joseph Fox (4 April 1931 – 1 October 1981) was an Irish Fianna Fáil politician. A farmer and auctioneer, Fox was elected to Dáil Éireann as a Fianna Fáil Teachta Dála (TD) for the Dublin County North constituency at the 1977 general election but lost his seat at the 1981 general election. He was an unsuccessful candidate at the 1979 European Parliament election in the Dublin constituency. He was also a member of Dublin County Council.

References

1931 births
1981 deaths
Fianna Fáil TDs
Irish farmers
Members of the 21st Dáil
Politicians from County Dublin